The Yinhe incident occurred after a claim was made in 1993 by the United States government that the China-based container ship Yinhe was carrying chemical weapon materials to Iran. The United States Navy forced the surrounding Middle Eastern countries to refuse docking rights to the Yinhe, leaving it in the international waters of the Indian Ocean for twenty-four days.
Cutting off their usage of the GPS so that the ship was stranded. Despite eventually concluding that the cargo ship did not contain any precursors of chemical weapons, the U.S. government refused to apologize, stating that "the United States had acted in good faith on intelligence." American officials within the Clinton administration later accused China of deliberately spreading false intelligence in order to cause the incident, without showing any evidence, referring to it as a "sting". It was later changed to claim that during this period, the Yinhe may have unloaded or dumped its cargo into the sea on the way, again without proof. However, the US military monitored the whereabouts of the Yinhe throughout the whole process, but this assertion that there is no evidence to support it is not credible. Finally, it was stated that the U.S. operation was “based on trust in different sources of intelligence, even though (these intelligence sources) were all wrong.”

The ship 
The Yinhe was a Chinese container ship that ran on a fixed schedule between Tianjin Port and Kuwait. Its scheduled port visits included Shanghai, Hong Kong, Singapore, Jakarta, Dubai and Daman and Diu. It belonged to the China Ocean Shipping Corporation, and had maintained a perfect on-time schedule before the incident.

Timeline 
In late July 1993, the United States alleged that a Chinese civilian container ship, the Yinhe, was carrying chemical weapon materials to Abbas Harbor, Iran, citing a ship's manifest obtained by its Central Intelligence Agency. It stopped the Yinhe. The United States requested that the Yinhe turn back to China in order to unload its alleged cargo, but China refused after conducting an investigation and determining that no chemical weapons precursors were present on the ship. After China denied the allegation, the United States unilaterally cut off the Yinhe's GPS, causing it lose direction and anchor on the high seas -- ultimately for twenty-four days until it agreed to inspection.

On August 8, 1993, China publicly announced that the Yinhe was under "intrusive surveillance" by American warships in international waters—which American officials claimed was a sign that China sought a confrontation—and declared officially that the ship did not carry any chemical weapons materials. The U.S. government dismissed the declaration, and a senior member of the Clinton administration initially stated that while it would be illegal for the United States to board the ship for inspection, the United States would continue efforts to persuade China to recall the ship.

On August 20, 1993, after being stuck for three weeks in international waters, the ship was allowed to "take on fuel and water ... to ensure the safety of the vessel and crew" after repeated requests from the shipping company. A ship registered to the United Arab Emirates brought fresh water, vegetables and fruits.

On August 28, 1993, the United States and China agreed to an open inspection of the ship at a Saudi Arabian port, by a Saudi-United States joint team, following a preliminary boarding by seventeen Chinese and two Saudi officials.

The inspection 
All 628 containers on board were inspected by U.S. technicians. The U.S. intelligence specified thiodiglycol and thionyl chloride as the chemical weapon materials. In the end, "the complete inspection of all the containers aboard the Yinhe showed conclusively [that the chemicals] were not among the ship's cargo". The only chemical material carried by the ship was ordinary solid paint.

On September 4, the representatives of the Chinese, Saudi and United States governments jointly signed a certification that the ship's cargo did not contain materials related to chemical weapons.

Aftermath 
American officials declined to apologize for the incident, claiming that the United States had acted in "good faith" on intelligence from a number of sources. They indicated that they were discussing the issue of whether the United States was obligated to pay compensation to the ship owner, China Ocean Shipping Corporation. Ultimately, the United States refused to pay compensation.

When the accusations were reported in China, Chinese nationalism increased in response. The Chinese government attempted to downplay the issue by claiming that the accusation was not the official stance of the American government and did not represent the majority opinion in the United States. A U.S. House report in 2001 concluded that the Yinhe incident "has been repeatedly cited as a case of international bullying by the United States".

Despite the humiliation of the Yinhe incident, Chinese President Jiang Zemin adopted a diplomatic posture of goodwill and a "sixteen-characters formula" to working with the United States: enhancing confidence, avoiding troubles, expanding cooperation, and avoiding confrontation.

When reporting on the BeiDou navigation system, the Chinese mainland media often mentioned the fact that the United States partially shut down the GPS navigation service in the sea area where the Yinhe was located during the Yinhe incident to force the Yinhe to stop sailing, as a reason "to develop an independent 'BeiDou' for China,” and also as the reason for “Sun Jiadong and Shen Rongjun, deputy director of the National Defense Science, Technology and Industry Commission, jointly signing a letter to propose the launch of China’s satellite navigation project”.

See also 

 China and weapons of mass destruction
 United States bombing of the Chinese embassy in Belgrade

References 

1993 in China
1993 in international relations
1993 in the United States
China–United States relations
History of the Indian Ocean
International maritime incidents
Maritime incidents in 1993